Glen Orchy is a glen in Argyll and Bute, Scotland. It runs from Bridge of Orchy to Dalmally.

Geography

Glen Orchy is about 17 km or 11 miles long, and runs south-west from Bridge of Orchy to Dalmally following the River Orchy through the Caledonian Forest. There are no settlements in the glen: just a few isolated buildings. The Eas Urchaidh and Eas a’ Chathaidh are waterfalls within the glen. The continuation westward past Dalmally to Loch Awe is known as the Strath of Orchy. The B8074 road runs the length of Glen Orchy.

Name
Glen Orchy was known by the by-name of Gleann Urchaidh nam badan (Glen Orchy of the copses), and the parish of Glen Orchy was An Dìseart (the hermitage), a name appearing in Clachan an Dìseirt (the village of the hermitage), the local Gaelic name of the village of Dalmally.

History
Glen Orchy was one of the major homes of Clan Gregor until the clan was outlawed in 1603 by King James VI. The settlement of Glenorchy, in New Zealand, was named after Glen Orchy.

Notable people
One of the better known inhabitants of the glen was Duncan Ban MacIntyre.

Sport
Glenorchy Camanachd is a shinty team from Dalmally in the Strath of Orchy.

In popular culture
"The Bridge at Glen Orchy" is referred to in the 1995 film Rob Roy, as the place where Rob Roy MacGregor (Liam Neeson) is to be lynched for rustling the cattle and kidnapping the Factor of the Duke of Montrose (John Hurt).

See also
Map of places in Glen Orchy compiled from this article

References

Valleys of Argyll and Bute
Glens of Scotland